The New York City Half Marathon (branded as the United Airlines NYC Half) is an annual half marathon road running race from Brooklyn's Prospect Park to Manhattan's Central Park via the Manhattan Bridge, held since 2006.  It passes through or by Times Square, Grand Central, and both Grand Army Plazas.  New York Road Runners (NYRR) administers the race.

History

Numerous world class runners have participated in the race, including marathon record holders Haile Gebrselassie and Paula Radcliffe, Olympic marathon medalists Catherine Ndereba, Meb Keflezighi,  and Deena Kastor, 2008 U.S. Olympic marathoner Dathan Ritzenhein, and American half marathon record holder Ryan Hall.

Gebrselassie set the men's course record in 2007, with a time of 59:24. On March 20, 2016, Molly Huddle set the women's record with a time of 1:07:41.

In its earlier years, the event was run on various dates in the summer; in 2010, it was moved to March. The 2010 race had a field of 14,821 registered runners and 11,604 finishers. Mary Wittenberg, president of the NYRR, said in 2010 that she expected a possible growth of over 20,000 participants in future years.

On October 8, 2014, United Airlines, which was the sponsor of many of the NYRR races, became the title sponsor of the NYC Half Marathon.

The 2020 and 2021 races were cancelled due to the COVID-19 pandemic. All registrants were given the option of obtaining a full refund or guaranteed, non-complimentary entry to the March 2022 race.

Course

2006–2008

From 2006 through 2008, the course started in Central Park near East 85th Street and looped clockwise for approximately 7.6 miles (more than one full loop) until runners exited Central Park onto Seventh Avenue and through Times Square.  Runners made a right turn onto West 42nd Street, followed by a left turn onto the West Side Highway, adjacent to the Hudson River.  The race ended on the West Side Highway by Rector Street, near the southern tip of Manhattan.

2009–2017

From 2009 through 2017, the course started near East 72nd Street with a counter-clockwise  loop around hilly Central Park. The course then flattened and went along Seventh Avenue to Times Square, where it followed 42nd Street to the West Side Highway, adjacent to the Hudson River. The race passed through Battery Park and finished at Wall Street near the southern tip of Manhattan.

Since 2018

In October 2017, NYRR announced a course change for the 2018 race. The course begins in Prospect Park and heads northwest along Flatbush Avenue, and then crosses the Manhattan Bridge. Runners then proceed through the Lower East Side towards FDR Drive, and exit onto 42nd Street. At Times Square, the course heads north on Seventh Avenue into Central Park. Runners follow the main loop in Central Park clockwise, cut across the park on the 102nd Street Transverse, and then finish near 75th Street on the west side of the park.

Winners

Key: Course record (in bold)

Notes

See also

 New York City Marathon

References

External links
 Official website

2006 establishments in New York City
Annual sporting events in the United States
Central Park
Half marathons in the United States
March sporting events
Recurring sporting events established in 2006
Sports in Manhattan
Sports competitions in New York City